Axel Axgil (3 April 1915 – 29 October 2011) and Eigil Axgil (24 April 1922 – 22 September 1995) were Danish gay activists and a longtime couple. They were the first gay couple to enter into a registered partnership in the world following Denmark's legalisation of same-sex partnership registration in 1989, a landmark legislation which they brought about. They adopted the surname, Axgil, a combination of their given names, as an expression of their commitment.

Biography
Axel, born Axel Lundahl-Madsen, and Eigil, born Eigil Eskildsen, inspired by the 1948 UN Declaration of Human Rights, together with friends, founded F-48 or Forbundet af 1948 (The Association of 1948), Denmark's first gay rights organization. By 1951, membership had grown to 1,339 with branches in Sweden and Norway. In 1985, F-48 became the Danish National Association of Gays and Lesbians (Landsforeningen for Bøsser og Lesbiske, Forbundet af 1948 or LBL). The couple launched a magazine, Vennen (The Friend).

In 1989, Denmark became the first nation to recognize registered partnerships for same-sex couples, nearly equal to opposite-sex marriage. On 1 October 1989, the Axgils and 10 other Danish couples were married by Tom Ahlberg, deputy mayor of Copenhagen, in the city hall. The Axgils had been a couple for 40 years. In 2013, Axel Axgil was named by Equality Forum as one of 31 icons of the LGBT History Month. LGBT Denmark's annual awards show, Danish Rainbow Awards – AXGIL, is named after them.

In 2012, it was revealed that during the German occupation of Denmark during World War II, Eigil Axgil enlisted in the Waffen-SS in 1943 and served there until the end of the war. Eigil Axgil was subsequently prosecuted for his membership of Waffen-SS but managed to keep it somewhat secret until eventually Axel Axgil reluctantly confirmed it in a biography in 2012. The revelation thus sparked turmoil and controversy because of the Axgils' notability in the Danish LGBT community, and calls were made for LGBT Denmark to strike "Axgil" from the name of the Danish Rainbow Awards – AXGIL.

Deaths
Eigil Axgil died on 22 September 1995 at the age of 73. Axel Axgil died on 29 October 2011 at the age of 96.

See also
Same-sex marriage in Denmark

References

External links
 1st Partnership page
 Famous GLTB

Danish collaborators with Nazi Germany
Danish Waffen-SS personnel
Gay military personnel
Danish gay men
Danish LGBT rights activists
Married couples
Same-sex couples
Same-sex marriage in Denmark